Walnut is an unincorporated community in Knox County, Nebraska, United States.

History
A post office was established at Walnut in 1894, and remained in operation until it was discontinued in 1956. Walnut was named from a grove of walnut trees near the town site.

References

Unincorporated communities in Knox County, Nebraska
Unincorporated communities in Nebraska